Patricia Ann Okker was named president of New College of Florida in 2021. She was previously a professor of English at the University of Missouri, where she focused her studies on American literature.

Education and career 
Okker has a B.A. from Allegheny College and an M.A. from the University of Georgia. Okker earned her Ph.D. in 1990 from the University of Illinois Urbana-Champaign. Okker started as an assistant professor at the University of Missouri in 1990, and was promoted to full professor in 2004. From 2005 until 2011 she served as chair of the English department, and from 2017 until 2021 Okker served as dean of the College of Arts and Sciences at the University of Missouri.

In July 2021 Okker became president of New College of Florida, a position she held until 2023 when Governor Ron DeSantis announced that he would replace Okker as college president with Richard Corcoran.

Work 
Okker is known for her work in the field of American literature, where she specializes in the history of periodicals. While considering topics for her Ph.D. dissertation she became interested in women who had edited magazines, which led to her Ph.D. dissertation on Sarah Josepha Hale who was known for her work on women's magazines.

Selected publications

Honors and awards 
In 2003 Okker received the William T. Kemper Fellowship for Teaching Excellence from the University of Missouri.

References 

Living people
Women heads of universities and colleges
Allegheny College alumni
University of Georgia alumni
University of Illinois Urbana-Champaign alumni
21st-century American women writers
Presidents of New College of Florida
University of Missouri faculty
Year of birth missing (living people)